Moulay Hassan bin Mohammed (born 8 May 2003) is the Crown Prince of Morocco. He is the elder child of King Mohammed VI of Morocco and Princess Lalla Salma. He has a younger sister, Princess Lalla Khadija. He is named after his grandfather Hassan II. Upon his accession, he is expected to bear the regnal name Hassan III. In 2013, Hassan began participating with his father at public official engagements.

Early life and education 
Moulay Hassan was born in Rabat Royal Palace on 8 May 2003, to Mohammed VI of Morocco and his wife, Princess Lalla Salma. He was named after his grandfather, the late King Hassan II. The oldest child of the current king, he has a sister, Princess Lalla Khadija.

He is a polyglot who speaks several languages, including Arabic, French, English, and Spanish.

He obtained his baccalaureate in 2020 and joined the Faculty of Governance and Economic and Social Sciences (FGSES), an affiliate of the Mohammed VI Polytechnic University in Ben Guerir (UM6P) for the 2020–2021 school year.

On 20 December 2022, Moulay Hassan along King Mohammed VI and Prince Moulay Rachid, received the members of the National football team, in the Throne Room at the Royal Palace in Rabat, after their brilliant performance in the 2022 FIFA World Cup.

Official duties 

Moulay Hassan was the youngest participant at the One Planet Summit in France in 2017, where he gained international acclaim. In this respect, he is following in his father’s footsteps.

On 28 June 2019, Moulay Hassan represented King Mohammed VI at the operations launch ceremony of the new port Tanger Med II, cementing Tanger-Med as a leading port and vital asset to the Mediterranean.

On 30 September 2019, in Paris, Moulay Hassan attended the funeral of the late French President Jacques Chirac, which took place at the Saint-Sulpice Church. On the same day, he took part in the lunch organized by President Emmanuel Macron, at the Élysée Palace, in honor of the Heads of State present at the funeral of the deceased president Chirac.

Moulay El Hassan inaugurated the International Exhibition and Museum of the Biography of the Prophet and Islamic Civilization at the Islamic World Educational, Scientific and Cultural Organization (ICESCO) in Rabat on November 17.

Ancestry

See also 
 List of current heirs apparent

References

External links 
 

2003 births
Living people
People from Rabat
Moroccan princes
Moroccan royalty
Heirs apparent
Sons of kings